Mezholezy is a municipality and village in Domažlice District in the Plzeň Region of the Czech Republic. It has about 100 inhabitants.

Administrative parts
The village of Buková is an administrative part of Mezholezy.

References

Villages in Domažlice District